Richard T. Crane Medical Prep High School (formerly known as Crane Tech Prep or Crane Tech High School) is a public 4–year medical prep high school located in the Near West Side neighborhood of Chicago, Illinois, United States. The school is operated by the Chicago Public Schools district. Crane is named for businessman Richard T. Crane. Beginning with the 2012–13 school year, the school transitioned to a medical preparatory high school, partnering with Rush Hospital, City Colleges Of Chicago, and University of Illinois at Chicago.

History
Crane was founded as a males-only school at 12th Street and Michigan Avenue in 1890. It was originally known as the English High and Manual Training School.  In 1903, the school moved to its present location and was renamed in honor of businessman Richard T. Crane. When the school went co-ed in 1954, it began to de-emphasize its "technical" label, though it continued to offer courses like auto shop and drafting. Between 1911 and 1969, the school shared its building with Crane College, the first junior college in Chicago. The college moved out in 1969 and is now known as Malcolm X College. On November 30, 2011, Chicago Public Schools CEO Jean-Claude Brizard announced that Crane, along with several other schools, would either be closed or phased out.  Under this plan, Crane would remain open but no longer accept freshman students, who would be routed instead to either Wells, Manley, Marshall, or Farragut. In April 2012, however, Brizard announced that Crane would be retained and redeveloped into a health sciences high school. Crane High School previously housed Chicago Talent Development Charter High School during the 2012-13 academic year, prior to Chicago Talent's closure the following year.

Athletics
Crane became a charter member of the Chicago Public League in 1913. Since then, it has won eleven city titles in boys' basketball (1921, 1928, 1929, 1931, 1932, 1940, 1957, 1964, 1968, 1972, 2003). The school has produced a number of professional basketball players (see below).

Notable alumni
Berle Adams was a music executive and founder of Mercury Records
 Harry Aleman was a mobster and feared enforcer for the Chicago Outfit
 Tony Allen is an NBA player
 Cory Blackwell is a former NBA player (1984–85), who played for the Seattle SuperSonics
 Milt Bocek was an MLB player (Chicago White Sox)
 Will Bynum (born 1983) was an NBA player and 2007 Israeli Basketball Premier League MVP
 Lou Chirban (1930–2008) was an MLB pitcher, one of the first five white players to join the Negro American League
 Sherron Collins played basketball for the University of Kansas
 Martin Cooper invented the handheld cell phone and made the first portable cellular phone call on April 3, 1973 
Chaz Ebert attorney and businesswoman. 1969  Crane High School graduate
 Milt Galatzer was an MLB player (Cleveland Indians, Cincinnati Reds)
 Charles M. Goodman, FAIA (1906–1992) was a master architect of modern architecture
 Robert F. "Ace" Gruenig (1913-1958) was a basketball player during the 1930s and 1940s.  On August 11, 1963, Gruenig was enshrined in the Naismith Memorial Basketball Hall of Fame.
 George Halas was a professional football player, professional baseball player, coach, executive, and pioneer of the NFL.  He led the Chicago Bears to six NFL championships, and was a charter member of the Pro Football Hall of Fame in 1963.
 Richard Hamming (1915-1998), was a computer pioneer in error correction code, mathematician on the Manhattan Project, and winner of Turing Award. He graduated from Crane in 1933.
 Walter J. Hamming (1911-1975), was a meteorologist for the Army Air Corp in World War II who supported the June 6 1944 Normandy invasion and later worked for the Los Angeles Air Quality Management District where he established the chemical relationship of smog and automobile emissions and advocated automotive industry accountability. 
 J. Allen Hynek was a professor of astronomy at Northwestern University.  He was considered an expert on the subject of UFO phenomena.  A former investigator for Project Blue Book, he invented the close encounter scale (first kind, second kind, third kind).
 Shirley M. Jones (1939-2016), Illinois state legislator
 John Kenerson was a professional football player
 Carol D. Lee is a professor, educational researcher, school director and author.
LeRoy Martin, Chicago police officer who served as the second African-American superintendent of the Chicago Police Department (1987-1992). 
 Joseph M. Mleziva, farmer and Wisconsin state legislatore
 Edward Nedza, Illinois state legislator and businessman
 Ken Norman is a former NBA forward (1987–97) who starred for the University of Illinois. He played most of his career with the Los Angeles Clippers, who drafted him in the first round of the 1987 NBA Draft.
 Chris Pelekoudas was a Major League Baseball umpire
 Joe Reiff was a three-time All-American basketball player at Northwestern
 Wally Ris was a swimmer who won two gold medals at the 1948 Summer Olympics
 William "Bill" Shaw, politician, noted as the first African-American to serve as mayor of Dolton, Illinois
 Robert Shaw, politician
 Sam Sibert was a basketball player and second-round pick in 1972 NBA draft
 Lou Skizas is a former MLB player (New York Yankees, Kansas City Athletics, Detroit Tigers, Chicago White Sox)
 Sammy Skobel was a member of the Roller Derby Hall of Fame
 Andre Wakefield is a former NBA player (1978–80)
 Verdine White of Earth Wind and Fire group. 1969 Crane High School graduate
 Philip Shapiro Lesly, class of 1936, was editor of the Crane student newspaper, then the only daily high school newspaper in the U.S. Went on to Northwestern (editor of Daily Northwestern) and then a long career as an author and public relations theorist. The Phlip Lesly Co. was among the largest U.S. pr agencies in the 1960s and 1970s.

References

External links

 Chicago Public Schools directory listing

Public high schools in Chicago
Educational institutions established in 1890
1890 establishments in Illinois